The 1916 Winchester by-election was held on 19 October 1916.  The by-election was held due to the incumbent Conservative MP, Guy Baring, being killed in action in the Battle of the Somme.  It was won by the Conservative candidate Douglas Carnegie.

References

1916 in England
Politics of Winchester
1916 elections in the United Kingdom
By-elections to the Parliament of the United Kingdom in Hampshire constituencies
20th century in Hampshire
October 1916 events